Tap! was a magazine for owners of Apple’s iOS devices (iPhone, iPad and iPod Touch), published by Future plc. It was established by Christopher Phin and was a sister title to MacFormat.

Content
The magazine selected and reviewed apps and games from the App Store as well as a range of hardware accessories for iOS devices. There were tutorials on getting the most from your iPad, iPhone or iPod Touch, getting started help for those who are new to the platform, and a small section that gives best practice and technical advice to iOS developers.

The last issue of the magazine was published in August 2013.

Editorial team

 Editor Christopher Phin
 Editor-in-Chief Graham Barlow
 Production Editor Matthew Bolton
 Staff Writer Laurence Cable
 Deputy Art Editor Chris Hedley
 Games Editor Craig Grannell
 Developer Evangelist Matt Gemmell

References

External links
 Tap! official website

2010 establishments in the United Kingdom
2013 establishments in the United Kingdom
Bi-monthly magazines published in the United Kingdom
Monthly magazines published in the United Kingdom
Defunct computer magazines published in the United Kingdom
Magazines established in 2010
Magazines disestablished in 2013